is a Japanese musician and singer from Japan. Maeda is best known as the singer and guitarist of the theme songs of Ultraman Dyna and Blue SWAT.

Musical work

Ultraman: The Ultimate Hero 1993

Blue SWAT 1994 
 "TRUE DREAM"
 
 
 
 
 "HELLO THERE!"

Gekisou Sentai Carranger 1996 
 "CATCH THE WIND"

Ultraman: Super Fighter Legend (OVA) 1996

Ultraman Dyna 1997

Ultraman Tiga & Ultraman Dyna 1998 
 "SHININ on LOVE" (with Hironobu Kageyama)

Ultraman Neos 2000 
 "Ultraman Neos" (ウルトラマンネオス, Urutoraman Neosu)
 "Ultraseven 21" (ウルトラセブン21, Urutorasebun 21)

External links 
 Personal Blog
 Tatsuya Maeda in Anison Database

1958 births
Living people
Japanese male singers
Japanese guitarists
People from Naha
Musicians from Okinawa Prefecture
Anime musicians